Pimelea curviflora, also known  as curved rice-flower, is a shrub in the family Thymelaeaceae and  is endemic to Australia. It is a small, hairy shrub with greenish-yellow or red tubular flowers.

Description
The leaves are arranged in opposite pairs or alternately, on a short petiole and end in a pointed tip. The upper leaf hairs are spreading or flattened then becoming silky, short and somewhat less twisted, upper leaf surface smooth or with shorter hairs. The leaves may be uniformly coloured or vary on the upperside or underneath. Flowering occurs from late spring to early summer.

Taxonomy and naming
Pimelea curviflora was first formally described in 1810 Robert Brown and the description was published in Prodromus florae Novae Hollandiae et insulae Van-Diemen, exhibens characteres plantarum quas annis 1802-1805. The specific epithet (curviflora) is derived from the Latin curvi- meaning "curved" and -florus meaning "-flowered".

Varieties of P. curviflora have been described, and the following have been accepted by the Australian Plant Census:
Flowering occurs from November to February and the fruit is straight.
Flowering occurs in most months with a peak from October to January, and the fruit is curved.
Flowering main occurs from September to January and the fruit is straight. 
Pimelea curviflora var. gracilis (R.Br.) Flowering occurs from July to January and the fruit is straight, or occasionally curved.
Flowering occurs throughout the year with a peak from October to January, and the fruit is straight.

Distribution and habitat
Curved rice-flower is a variable widespread species found growing in New South Wales, south-eastern South Australia, south-eastern Queensland  on or near the Great Dividing Range and coastal areas from Brisbane to Adelaide. It grows in forests, grassland and woodlands amongst acacia, eucalypt, callitris, usually on clay and shale soils. Also in rainforest amongst vine thickets. A common, widespread species in Victoria including montane woodland also found in Tasmania.

Variety curviflora is restricted to coastal areas around Sydney where it grows on sandstone. Variety divergens is widespread on the coast, ranges and western slopes from the Boyne River in Queensland to the Sydney region. Variety gracilis usually grows in forest, sometimes in rocky sites, and is widespread from the extreme south-east of Queensland, through eastern New South Wales and southern Victoria to south-eastern South Australia and northern Tasmania. Variety sericea grows in sandy soil in open forest from the extreme south-east of Queensland, in eastern New South Wales and Victoria, where it is widespread, to south-eastern South Australia and islands of the Furneaux Group in Tasmania. Variety subglabrata grows in scrub and pastures from the Goulburn River to Nowra in New South Wales.

Conservation status
Pimelea curviflora var. curviflora is listed as "vulnerable" under the Australian Government Environment Protection and Biodiversity Conservation Act 1999 and the New South Wales Government Biodiversity Conservation Act 2016. The main threats to the species include habitat loss and degradation, weed invasion and road and trail maintenance.

References

curviflora
Flora of New South Wales
Flora of South Australia
Flora of Victoria (Australia)
Flora of Queensland
Flora of Tasmania
Malvales of Australia
Plants described in 1810